Morgan Sharpe p/b Adventure Cycles are a Guernsey-based, French Elite Amateur cycling team.

Profile
The team are sponsored by Genesis, a bike manufacturer. The team rides senior semi-professional events in the United Kingdom and France, as well as a number of amateur events in Guernsey and Jersey.

The team is founded and managed by professional cyclist James McLaughlin of Madison-Genesis.

Cycling teams based in France